Lose Your Shirt is a board game published in 1976 by Waddingtons.

Contents
Lose Your Shirt is a game in which players move their horses using cards matching the colors of the horses.

Reception
Brian Walker reviewed the game as First Past the Post for Games International magazine, and gave it 3 stars out of 5, and stated that "A simple, fun game for 2-6 players, to which a certain piquancy could be added by playing for real money. Not that I would recommend such a course, unless you want to lose your shirt, that is."

Reviews
Games
Jeux & Stratégie #58
Games & Puzzles #57

References

Board games introduced in 1976
Waddingtons games